{{Infobox film
| name           = One Crazy Summer
| image          = One crazy summer.jpg
| image_size     =
| alt            =
| caption        = Theatrical release poster by Carl Ramsey
| director       = Savage Steve Holland
| producer       = Michael Jaffe
 | writer        = Savage Steve Holland
| starring       = 
| music          = Cory Lerios
| cinematography = Isidore Mankofsky
| editing        = Alan Balsam
| studio         = A&M Films
| distributor    = Warner Bros.
| released       = 
| runtime        = 89 minutes
| country        = United States
| language       = English
| budget         = $9 million<ref>[https://catalog.afi.com/Film/57432-ONE-CRAZYSUMMER One Crazy Summer' at AFI]</ref>
| gross          = $13 million
}}One Crazy Summer is a 1986 American romantic comedy film written and directed by Savage Steve Holland, and starring John Cusack, Demi Moore, Bobcat Goldthwait, Curtis Armstrong and Joel Murray. The original film score was composed by Cory Lerios.

Plot
Hoops McCann, a recent high school graduate, fails to get a basketball scholarship, disappointing his parents. He hopes to be admitted to the Rhode Island School of Design, and must write and illustrate a love story for his application. He joins his friends, siblings George and Squid Calamari, to spend the summer on the island of Nantucket, Massachusetts.

En route, they pick up a young rock singer named Cassandra Eldridge, who is pursued by a motorcycle gang at the time. Once on the island, Hoops and George, along with twin brothers Egg and Clay Stork and outcast Ack-Ack Raymond, must help Cassandra save her grandfather's house from the greedy Beckersted family (led by the callous Aguilla). Along the way, Hoops must find a way to write his cartoon love story.

Hoops runs afoul of Teddy Beckersted and his neglected girlfriend, Cookie. She secretly offers Hoops a date, and he is persuaded to go out with her even though he had promised to appear at Cassandra's first musical performance (which turns out to be sparsely attended). Hoops and Cookie go to a drive-in that night, where Teddy's friend Ty sees them and notifies Teddy.

Meanwhile, Egg gets stuck in a Godzilla costume and causes havoc at Beckersted's promotional party for the Beckersted Estates (which would be located at the spot of Cassandra's grandfather's house). Hoops, George, Egg and Ack-Ack run into Teddy and his friends. As he threatens them, Cassandra appears and offers an impromptu basketball challenge between him and Hoops; Teddy dominates and Hoops fails. After spraying Teddy and his friends with Mace, Cassandra is upset that Hoops did not appear for her performance and lied that he was a good basketball player.

In an effort to make it up to her, Hoops and his friends promote her next performance, which turns out to be a big success, and Cassandra forgives him. However, Aguilla immediately forecloses on the house before it can be saved. Ack-Ack proposes they take part in the local regatta, despite Hoops' fear of the water. Nevertheless, they find and renovate an old boat to use. The regatta starts with the teams using paddles, then sails. Teddy's team recklessly injures a member of one team and Ack-Ack jumps into the water to save him. Aguilla, having stowed away on Teddy's boat, sabotages Hoops' sail with his crossbow. To repair the mast, Hoops successfully shoots the new guyline into the mast and they continue onward. Before Aguilla could shoot the mast again, he is thrown overboard by Squid operating a mechanical dolphin from a nearby movie set, as retaliation for when he kicked her beloved dog earlier. When the teams use the motors, Hoops and his team win after using Teddy's car engine as their motor.

Hoops and his friends celebrate their victory—they are awarded the prize, Squid's dog turns out okay (after giving birth to puppies), George hooks up with Cookie, and Ack-Ack wins his stern father's approval for his heroics. Despite winning, Hoops offers the trophy to Teddy if he spares Cassandra's house, but Teddy immediately backs out on his promise. However, Old Man Beckersted (father of Aguilla and grandfather of Teddy) gives back the trophy and spares Cassandra's house, stating he was not going to "put a dime" in the Beckersted Estates; he then drags Teddy away by his ear.

With the prize returned and the house spared, Hoops and Cassandra kiss, and she inspires a love story for his application. In the final scene, George's uncle Frank finally wins a $1 million prize from a radio contest (having been driven insane every summer for trying to win), but his phone gets disconnected and his prize is given away to someone else; he snaps and promptly uses a rocket launcher to blow up the radio station, and shortly thereafter the Stork twins arrive and head to the still-burning station to roast marshmallows.

Cast

 John Cusack as Hoops McCann
 Demi Moore as Cassandra Eldridge
 Curtis Armstrong as Ack Ack Raymond
 Bobcat Goldthwait as Egg Stork
 Joel Murray as George Calamari
 William Hickey as Old Man Beckerstead
 Joe Flaherty as General Raymond
 Mark Metcalf as Aguilla Beckerstead
 John Matuszak as Stain
 Kimberly Foster as Cookie Campbell
 Matt Mulhern as Teddy Beckerstead
 Rich Little as Radio contest DJ
 Tom Villard as Clay Stork
 Jeremy Piven as Ty
 Rich Hall as Wilbur, Gas station attendant
 Taylor Negron as Taylor, Gas station attendant
 Billie Bird as Grandma Calamari
 Bruce Wagner as Uncle Frank

Production
Several locations on Cape Cod, Massachusetts were used for the film: Saint Pope John Paul II High School (as Generic High School), Hyannis West Elementary School (as Generic Elementary), the Woods Hole, Martha's Vineyard And Nantucket Steamship Authority ferry dock in Woods Hole, where the characters board the ferry, and the motorcycle gang leader jumps his motorcycle into the water. The gas station bathroom scene was shot on a stage built in the MBL Club in Woods Hole. The inside of General Raymond's Army-Navy store is Mass Bay Company, located at 595 Main Street, Hyannis, Massachusetts. The Stork brothers' gas station is the (then-Amoco) located at 1098 Main Street in Dennis, Massachusetts.

Hoops McCann is named after the protagonist in Steely Dan's song "Glamour Profession" from the Gaucho album, who is introduced as a basketball aficionado.

The animation in the film was directed by Bill Kopp who previously worked with Savage Steve Holland on Better Off Dead and would later work with him on Eek! The Cat. Two animators who worked on the film, David Silverman and Wes Archer, would later be directors on The Simpsons and would animate Simpsons shorts on The Tracey Ullman Show with Kopp.

Savage Steve Holland was reportedly upset with Gene Siskel and Roger Ebert's criticism of his earlier film Better Off Dead, which led to the gag with the two bunnies that get blown up at the end of the movie who resemble the movie critics.

Reception
Nina Darnton of The New York Times wrote, "In spite of the director's flair for zany humor, this film is just absurd." Pat Graham of the Chicago Reader found it "Not a bad film, and certainly more polished than Holland's Better Off Dead'' debut, though it's marred by unevenness and the director's ineradicable penchant for infantile clowning."  The film maintains a 45% score at Rotten Tomatoes, based on 20 reviews.

See also
 List of American films of 1986

References

External links
 
 
 
 

1986 films
1986 romantic comedy films
American romantic comedy films
American teen comedy films
Films about comics
Films about vacationing
Films directed by Savage Steve Holland
Films set in Nantucket
Films shot in Massachusetts
Warner Bros. films
A&M Films films
Films with screenplays by Savage Steve Holland
1980s English-language films
1980s American films